Julian Horn Tolmé (28 January 1836 – 25 June 1878) was a British civil engineer, and the builder of the first Wandsworth Bridge in 1873, which was a toll bridge.

Life
Julian Horn Tolmé was born in Havana, Cuba, on the 28th January 1836, the son of Charles David Tolmé, who was a merchant and the British Consul there. He was educated at King's College London.

He suffered from rheumatism, and died on 25 June 1878, at Lindfield, West Sussex and is buried in a family vault on the west side of Highgate Cemetery.

References

1836 births
1878 deaths
Burials at Highgate Cemetery
Alumni of King's College London
British civil engineers
People of the Victorian era
People from Lindfield, West Sussex